Sweet Kiss may refer to:

 Sweet Kiss (horse), a horse ridden in February 1923 at Belmont Park by Frank Hayes (jockey)
 Sweet Kiss (band), a Japanese pop group which includes Saaya Irie, a Japanese child model
 Sweet Kiss (Romanian band), a former Romanian Eurodance band in the 1990s 3rei Sud Est
Sweet Kisses debut studio album by American pop singer Jessica Simpson
Sweet Kisses (Sqeezer song)